The Dongfeng Dam is an arch dam on the Wu River  northwest of Qingzhen in Guizhou Province, China. The primary purpose of the dam is hydroelectric power generation and it supports a 570 MW power station. Construction on the dam began in 1989 and the first generator was operational in 1994, the last in 1995. The generators were up-rated between 2004 and 2005; bringing their capacity from 170 MW each to 190 MW.

Design and operation
It sits at the base of a catchment area covering . The total reservoir capacity is  while  is for regulating. The dam has several discharge facilities; three spillway gates near the crest, three intermediate orifice openings, one chute spillway on the left bank and beside it, one spillway tunnel. The maximum discharge capacity of the spillways is  while all openings, including the power station tailrace, can discharge . The power station is located underground on the right bank of the dam. The intake releases water to three headrace tunnels which transfer into penstocks and supply each of the 190 MW Francis turbine-generators. Water is discharged back into the river via one tailrace tunnel.

See also

List of dams and reservoirs in China
List of major power stations in Guizhou

References

Dams in China
Hydroelectric power stations in Guizhou
Arch dams
Dams completed in 1995
Dams on the Wu River
Energy infrastructure completed in 1995
Underground power stations
1995 establishments in China